Ameles dumonti is a species of praying mantis that inhabits Tunisia and Morocco.

References

dumonti
Mantodea of Africa
Insects of North Africa
Insects described in 1943